93.7 Edge FM is a community radio station broadcast in the Bega Valley Shire of NSW, Australia and is not to be confused with Edge FM

References

External links
  Edge FM official website

Radio stations in New South Wales
Community radio stations in Australia
Radio stations established in 1993
1993 establishments in Australia